Jesse Wedgwood Mighels (1795–1861) was an American naturalist.

1795 births
1861 deaths
American naturalists